
Gmina Pawłów is a rural gmina (administrative district) in Starachowice County, Świętokrzyskie Voivodeship, in south-central Poland.

The gmina contains parts of the protected areas called Jeleniowska Landscape Park and Sieradowice Landscape Park.

Villages
Gmina Pawłów contains the villages and settlements of Ambrożów, Bronkowice, Brzezie, Bukówka, Chybice, Dąbrowa, Godów, Grabków, Jadowniki, Kałków, Krajków, Łomno, Modrzewie, Nieczulice, Nowy Bostów, Nowy Jawor, Pawłów, Pokrzywnica, Radkowice, Radkowice-Kolonia, Rzepin Drugi, Rzepin Pierwszy, Rzepin-Kolonia, Rzepinek, Stary Bostów, Stary Jawor, Świętomarz, Świślina, Szeligi, Szerzawy, Tarczek, Trzeszków, Warszówek, Wawrzeńczyce, Wieloborowice and Zbrza.

Neighbouring gminas
Gmina Pawłów is bordered by the town of Starachowice and by the gminas of Bodzentyn, Brody, Kunów, Nowa Słupia, Wąchock and Waśniów and Mests (suburb of Waśniów).

References
Polish official population figures 2006

Pawlow
Starachowice County